St George's Island, or Looe Island, is a small island off Cornwall, England.

St George's Island may also refer to:

 São Jorge Island, in the Azores
 St. George's Island, Bermuda, in Bermuda

See also 
 St. George Island (disambiguation)